This is a complete listing of unincorporated communities in Hardin County, Tennessee

 A
Austin

 B
Bethlehem
Big Ivy
Box Elder
Bruton Branch
Bucktown

 C
Caney Hollow
Center Star
Centerview
Cerro Gordo
Childers Hill
Counce
Crossroads
Crowtexas

 D
Damon

 F
Five Forks

 G
Gillises Mills
Grandview

 H
Hamburg
Havana
Hinkle
Holiday Hills
Holtsville
Hookers Bend
Hurley

 L
Lebanon
Loweryville

 M
Maddox
Morris

 N
New Harmony
New Hope
New Town
Nixon

 O
Oak Grove
Olive Hill
Olivet

 P
Phillips
Pickwick Dam
Piney Grove
Pittsburg Landing
Polards Mill
Pyburn

 R
Red Sulphur Springs
River Heights

 S
Shady Grove
Southside
Stout
Stringtown
Swift

 T
Thompson Crossroads

 W
Walkertown
Walnut Grove
West Hima
Winn Springs
Woodland Heights

Historical Unincorporated Communities and Ghost Towns
Economy
Gibbs
Hardinville the former seat of Hardin County
Paulks
Sand Mountain
Slab Town
Smiths Fork
Walnut Grove (This is a different Walnut Grove from the present day one which is listed above)
White Sulpher

 
 
Unincorporated